James Herbert Alward (November 1, 1865 – December 21, 1897) was an American football player and coach.  He served as the third head football coach at the University of Wisconsin–Madison for a single season in 1891, compiling a record of 3–1–1. Alward would go on to coach for the Armour Institute (later merged into Illinois Institute of Technology) and Rush Medical College.

He died of typhoid fever in 1897.

Head coaching record

References

1865 births
1897 deaths
19th-century players of American football
American football tackles
Harvard Crimson football players
Wisconsin Badgers football coaches
Lake Forest College alumni
Deaths from typhoid fever
People from Negaunee, Michigan
People from Oconto, Wisconsin
 infectious disease deaths in Illinois